Pseudochromis is a genus of fish in the family Pseudochromidae found in Indian and Pacific Ocean.

Species
There are currently 71 recognized species in this genus:
 Pseudochromis aldabraensis Bauchot-Boutin, 1958 (Orange dottyback)
 Pseudochromis alticaudex A. C. Gill, 2004 (Spot-breast dottyback)
 Pseudochromis ammeri A. C. Gill, G. R. Allen & Erdmann, 2012 (Raja Ampat dottyback) 
 Pseudochromis andamanensis Lubbock, 1980 (Andaman dottyback)
 Pseudochromis aureolineatus A. C. Gill, 2004 (Gold-lined dottyback)
 Pseudochromis aurulentus A. C. Gill & J. E. Randall, 1998 (Yellow-lip dottyback)
 Pseudochromis bitaeniatus (Fowler, 1931) (Double-striped dottyback)
 Pseudochromis caudalis Boulenger, 1898 (Stripe-tailed dottyback)
 Pseudochromis chrysospilus A. C. Gill & Zajonz, 2011 (Gold-spotted dottyback) 
 Pseudochromis coccinicauda (Tickell, 1888) (Yellow-breasted dottyback)
 Pseudochromis colei Herre, 1933 (False bandit dottyback) 
 Pseudochromis cometes A. C. Gill & J. E. Randall, 1998 (Commet dottyback)
 Pseudochromis cyanotaenia Bleeker, 1857 (Surge dottyback)
 Pseudochromis dilectus Lubbock, 1976
 Pseudochromis dixurus Lubbock, 1975 (Fork-tail dottyback)
 Pseudochromis dutoiti J. L. B. Smith, 1955 (Dutoit's dottyback) 
 Pseudochromis eichleri A. C. Gill, G. R. Allen & Erdmann, 2012 (Eichler's dottyback) 
 Pseudochromis elongatus Lubbock, 1980 (Elongate dottyback)
 Pseudochromis erdmanni A. C. Gill & G. R. Allen, 2011 (Erdmann's dottyback) 
 Pseudochromis flammicauda Lubbock & Goldman, 1976 (Fire-tail dottyback)
 Pseudochromis flavivertex Rüppell, 1835 (Sunrise dottyback)
 Pseudochromis flavopunctatus A. C. Gill & J. E. Randall, 1998 (Yellow-spotted dottyback)
 Pseudochromis fowleri Herre, 1934 (Philippines dottyback)
 Pseudochromis fridmani Klausewitz, 1968 (Orchid dottyback)
 Pseudochromis fuligifinis A. C. Gill & J. T. Williams, 2011 (Soot-tail dottyback) 
 Pseudochromis fuscus J. P. Müller & Troschel, 1849 (Brown dottyback)
 Pseudochromis howsoni G. R. Allen, 1995 (Howson's dottyback)
 Pseudochromis jace G. R. Allen, A. C. Gill & Erdmann, 2008 (Zippered dottyback)
 Pseudochromis jamesi L. P. Schultz, 1943 (Spot-tailed dottyback)
 Pseudochromis kolythrus A. C. Gill & R. Winterbottom, 1993
 Pseudochromis kristinae A. C. Gill, 2004 (Lip-stick dottyback)
 Pseudochromis leucorhynchus Lubbock, 1977 (White-nosed dottyback)
 Pseudochromis linda J. E. Randall & Stanaland, 1989 (Yellow-tail dottyback)
 Pseudochromis litus A. C. Gill & J. E. Randall, 1998 (Plain dottyback)
 Pseudochromis lugubris A. C. Gill & G. R. Allen, 2004 (Mournful dottyback)
 Pseudochromis luteus Aoyagi, 1943
 Pseudochromis madagascariensis A. C. Gill, 2004 (Madagascan dottyback)
 Pseudochromis magnificus Lubbock, 1977 (Magnificent dottyback)
 Pseudochromis marshallensis L. P. Schultz, 1953 (Marshall Islands dottyback)
 Pseudochromis matahari A. C. Gill, Erdmann & G. R. Allen, 2009 (Sun-burst dottyback)
 Pseudochromis melanurus A. C. Gill, 2004 (Black-tail dottyback)
 Pseudochromis melas Lubbock, 1977 (Dark dottyback)
 Pseudochromis mooii A. C. Gill, 2004 (Mooi's dottyback)
 Pseudochromis moorei Fowler, 1931 (Jaguar dottyback)
 Pseudochromis natalensis Regan, 1916 (Natal dottyback)
 Pseudochromis nigrovittatus Boulenger, 1897 (Black-stripe dottyback)
 Pseudochromis oligochrysus A. C. Gill, G. R. Allen & Erdmann, 2012 (Gold-ring dottyback) 
 Pseudochromis olivaceus Rüppell, 1835 (Olive dottyback)
 Pseudochromis omanensis A. C. Gill & Mee, 1993 
 Pseudochromis persicus J. A. Murray, 1887 (Blue-spotted dottyback)
 Pseudochromis perspicillatus Günther, 1862 (Southeast Asian black-stripe dottyback)  
 Pseudochromis pesi Lubbock, 1975 (Pale dottyback)
 Pseudochromis pictus A. C. Gill & J. E. Randall, 1998 (Painted dottyback)
 Pseudochromis punctatus Kotthaus, 1970 (Black-back dottyback)
 Pseudochromis pylei J. E. Randall & McCosker, 1989 (Pyle's dottyback)
 Pseudochromis quinquedentatus McCulloch, 1926 (Spiny dottyback)
 Pseudochromis ransonneti Steindachner, 1870 (Karimunjawa dottyback)
 Pseudochromis reticulatus A. C. Gill & Woodland, 1992 (Reticulate dottyback)
 Pseudochromis rutilus A. C. Gill, G. R. Allen & Erdmann, 2012 (Red-gold dottyback) 
 Pseudochromis sankeyi Lubbock, 1975 (Striped dottyback)
 Pseudochromis socotraensis A. C. Gill & Zajonz, 2011 (Socotra dottyback) 
 Pseudochromis springeri Lubbock, 1975 (Blue-striped dottyback)
 Pseudochromis steenei A. C. Gill & J. E. Randall, 1992 (Lyre-tail dottyback)
 Pseudochromis striatus A. C. Gill, K. T. Shao & J. P. Chen, 1995 (Striated dottyback)
 Pseudochromis tapeinosoma Bleeker, 1853 (Black-margin dottyback)
 Pseudochromis tauberae Lubbock, 1977 (Light-headed dottyback)
 Pseudochromis tigrinus G. R. Allen & Erdmann, 2012 (Tiger dottyback) 
 Pseudochromis tonozukai A. C. Gill & G. R. Allen, 2004 (Spot-stripe dottyback)
 Pseudochromis viridis A. C. Gill & G. R. Allen, 1996 (Green dottyback)
 Pseudochromis wilsoni (Whitley, 1929) (Yellow-fin dottyback)
 Pseudochromis yamasakii  A. C. Gill & Senou, 2016 (Dotty-belly dottyback)

References

 
Fish of the Indian Ocean
Fish of the Pacific Ocean
Pseudochrominae
Marine fish genera
Taxa named by Eduard Rüppell